Modrý Kameň (lit. "Blue Stone";) is a town and municipality in the Veľký Krtíš District of the Banská Bystrica Region of southern Slovakia.

Geography 
It is located in the Krupina Plain (Slovak: Krupinská planina) on the Krtíš and Riečka rivers. It is around 5 km from Veľký Krtíš and 50 km from Zvolen. With a population of around 1,600 it is the second smallest town in Slovakia.

History 
The name of the town was first mentioned as Keykkw (Hungarian: Kékkő) in 1290. The name of the settlement means "Blue rock". Ruins of the castle Modrý Kameň stand on a rock pinnacle above the town. The castle was built in the second half of the 13th century by the ancestors of the Balassa noble family. They had to recapture the castle from sons of Casimir of the Hunt-Poznan clan by a siege in 1290. The castle was captured by Ottoman troops in 1576, because its guard fled when they heard the approaching Ottomans. The castle was given up and subsequently destroyed by Ottoman troops in 1593. It was restored between 1609 and 1612 by Sigismund Balassa. The castle was ravaged many times during the 17th century, so it became ruined and abandoned. The Balassa family built a new Baroque mansion house on the side of castle hill in the early 18th century; stones of the former castle were used in the mansion building operations. The last member of the Balassa noble family died in 1899. After the demise of the Balassa family, the Almásy noble family became the proprietors of castle Modrý Kameň. They sold the demesne to the Czechoslovakian state in 1923.

In 1910 the settlement had 1347 mostly Slovak inhabitants, though a significant Hungarian minority lived in Modrý Kameň (then Kékkő) too. Modrý Kameň belonged to Nógrád (Novohrad) county until the end of World War I. The settlement was the center of district Modrý Kameň (Slovakian okres Modrý Kameň, Hungarian Kékkői járás) between 1912 and 1960. Electric network was built in 1943.

During World War II, an illegal antifascist communist organization operated in the settlement. During the Slovak National Uprising, Modrý Kameň was the center of the national revolutionary committee of the district, and partisan groups operated on the outskirts.

Modrý Kameň was pronounced a town in 1969.

Demographics 
According to the 2001 census, the town had 1,434 inhabitants. 92.82% of inhabitants were Slovaks, 2.79% Roma, 2.02% Hungarians and 0.35% Czechs. The religious make-up was 79.22% Roman Catholics, 8.44% people with no religious affiliation and 7.60% Lutherans.

Sights 
Roman Catholic church was built in 1879 
Baroque chapel of St Anna was built in 1759
Modrý kameň Castle Museum (Marionette and toy museum, Valentine Balassi poet’s life and work, Ethnographic exhibition of the region, A look at the history of dental technology and stomatology)

Twin towns

Modrý Kameň is twinned with:

  Bercel, Hungary
  Opatów, Poland

Gallery

References

External links 
 
 
Castle Museum

Cities and towns in Slovakia
Villages and municipalities in Veľký Krtíš District
Castles in Slovakia